JoAnn D. Osmond (April 6, 1946) is a former Republican member of the Illinois House of Representatives, representing the 61st district from 2002 to 2014. She is also the owner of Osmond Insurance Services Ltd. Previously, Osmond served as Chairwoman of the Lake County Republican Central Committee from 1996 to 1998.

External links
Representative JoAnn D. Osmond (R) 61st District at the Illinois General Assembly
By session: 98th, 97th, 96th, 95th, 94th, 93rd
State Representative JoAnn Osmond constituency site
JoAnn Osmond for State Representative
 
Rep. JoAnn Osmond at Illinois House Republican Caucus

1946 births
Living people
Republican Party members of the Illinois House of Representatives
Women state legislators in Illinois
People from Antioch, Illinois
Businesspeople from Illinois
21st-century American politicians
21st-century American women politicians